Amara aulica is a species of beetle of the genus Amara in the Harpalinae subfamily. It is native to Europe.

References

aulica
Beetles of Europe
Beetles described in 1797
Taxa named by Georg Wolfgang Franz Panzer